Mwagna National Park (also Mwangné National Park) is a national park in Gabon. It covers an area of 1,160 km².

References

External links 
Virtual Tour of the National Parks

National parks of Gabon
Protected areas established in 2002
2002 establishments in Gabon